John Otis Wittenborn  (March 1, 1936 – March 29, 2016) was a professional American football kicker in the National Football League for the San Francisco 49ers and the Philadelphia Eagles.  He also played in the American Football League for the Houston Oilers.

See also
Other American Football League players

References

1936 births
2016 deaths
People from Sparta, Illinois
American football offensive guards
American football placekickers
Southeast Missouri State Redhawks football players
San Francisco 49ers players
Philadelphia Eagles players
Houston Oilers players
American Football League players
Players of American football from Illinois